Phaeosphaeria herpotrichoides is a fungal plant pathogen that infects the commercial crops rye and wheat.

It is common in Iceland where it infects a range of host species, including the wood of Betula pubescens, and the leaves of Dactylis glomerata, Deschampsia caespitosa, Kobresia myosuroides, Leymus arenarius, Luzula spicata, Milium effusum, Phleum pratense, Poa alpina, Poa glauca and Poa nemoralis.

References

Fungal plant pathogens and diseases
Rye diseases
Wheat diseases
Phaeosphaeriaceae
Fungi described in 1863
Taxa named by Giuseppe De Notaris